Trew is the surname of:

People
 Abdias Trew (1597-1669), German mathematician
 Antony Trew (1906–1996), South African writer and business man
 Arthur Trew (19th c.), Irish stevedore and Protestant preacher
 Beatrice Trew (1897–1976), Canadian politician
 Billy Trew (1878–1926), Welsh rugby union player
 Christoph Jacob Trew (1695–1769), German botanist
 Kim Trew, Canadian politician
 Peter Trew (born 1932), English politician
 Ray Trew, British businessman and football executive
 Susan Trew (born 1853), English composer
 Tony Trew (born 1941), South African politician

Fictional characters
 Thomas Trew, the main character in a fantasy series, see author Sophie Masson

See also
 Andrew Trew Wood (1826-1903) Canadian businessman and politician